Arlemont is an extinct town in Esmeralda County, in the U.S. state of Nevada.

History
The community originally was built up on the Chiatovich Ranch. A post office was established at Arlemont in 1916, and remained in operation until 1932. In 1941, Arlemont had 16 inhabitants.

References

Ghost towns in Esmeralda County, Nevada